Parasudis is a genus of greeneyes found in the Atlantic Ocean, with these recognized species:
 Parasudis fraserbrunneri (Poll, 1953)
 Parasudis truculenta (Goode & T. H. Bean, 1896) (longnose greeneye)

References

Chlorophthalmidae